We Shoot for the Moon is the fourth album by Slovenly, released in 1989 through SST Records.

Track listing

Personnel 
Slovenly
Steve Anderson – vocals
Rob Holtzman – drums
Lynn Johnston – horns
Tim Plowman – guitar, keyboards
Tom Watson – guitar, bass guitar
Scott Ziegler – guitar, bass guitar
Production and additional personnel
Guy Bennett – Trombone
Jacob Cohn – Alto Saxophone
Vitus Mataré – production, engineering, keyboards, maracas
Slovenly – production, engineering

References

External links 
 

1989 albums
Slovenly (band) albums
SST Records albums